Pinshi Transfer Station is a transportation hub located in East District and Yongkang District, an intercity bus terminal, a shopping center, a hotel, a metro station and an office building will be built there.

Pinshi Transfer Station is located in Yongkang District, Tainan, Taiwan.  It is a transfer station between the planned Tainan Metro Green Line and Blue Line.  The station is expected to be opened in 2025.

Mass transportation

Tainan Metro 

 Tainan Metro Blue Line
 Tainan Metro Green Line

Intercity bus 

 United Highway Bus
 1611 Tainan - National Freeway 1 - Taipei(via Xinying, Taichung Transfer Station, Ubus, Nankan, Taoyuan, Sanchong or North Chongqing Road)
 1612 Tainan - National Freeway 3 - Taipei (via Xinying, Beigang Road, Taichung Transfer Station, Ubus, Sanxia, Xindian or Wanfang)
 1625 Tainan - National Freeway 1 - Taichung (via Madou, Xinying, Chaoma)
 Kuo-Kuang Motor Transportation
 1837 Tainan - National Freeway 1 - Taipei（via Chaoma, Linkou, North Chongqing Road）
 1871 Tainan - National Freeway 1 - Taichung（via Chaoma）
 Ho-Shin Motor Transportation
 7500 Tainan - National Freeway 1 - Taipei（via Madou, Xinying, Chaoma, Hsinchu, Taoyuan and Sanchong）
 7501 Tainan - National Freeway 1 - Chiayi（via Xinying）
 7505 Tainan - National Freeway 1 - Banqiao（via Madou, Xinying and Zhongli）

City bus 

 Sifang Motor Transportation
 77 Pinshi Transfer Station - Aboriginal Cultural Museum
 Tainan Bus
 2 Anping - Kunshan University of Science and Technology
 15 Chi-Mei Hospital - Dacheng National Secondary School
 19 Aboriginal Cultural Museum - Dawan
 20 Nanfang Shopping Center - Yanxing - Heshun - Haidong National Elementary School
 Hsingnan Motor Transportation
 Green 17 Anping Industrial Area - Dawan - Xinhua
 Orange 12 Madou - Shanhua - Tainan Park
 H62 Tainan HSR Station - Rende - Chi-Mei Hospital

T-Bike (shared bikes) 

 Pinshi Park Station（40 lots）

Yongkang District